In gridiron football, the chain crew (commonly known as the "chain gang") is a crew that manages signal poles on one of the sidelines. There are three primary signal poles: the "rear rod" that marks the beginning of the current set of downs, the "forward rod" that marks the line to gain, and the "box" that marks the line of scrimmage. The two rods are attached at the bottom by a chain exactly ten yards long, while the "box" displays the current down number.

The chain crew, under the direction of the head linesman/down judge, signals the officials' decisions; it does not make decisions. Players look to the chain crew to see the line of scrimmage, the down number, and the line to gain. Officials may rely on the chain crew after a play (incomplete pass or penalty) whose outcome depends on the original spot of the ball. This also includes bringing the chains onto the field whenever an accurate measurement is needed to determine if a first down has been made.

Members
Three members of the chain crew hold poles upright. The bottom of each pole is placed along a sideline to denote a line across the gridiron to the opposite sideline.
A "rod man" holds the "rear rod" that marks the beginning of the current set of downs.
Another "rod man" holds the "forward rod" ten yards toward the defense's goal-line from the rear rod. This marker indicates the line to gain, which the offense must reach in their series of four downs in order to retain possession of the ball. The two rods (sometimes known as "sticks") are attached at the bottom by a chain exactly ten yards long. The chain is always taut so that the rods are ten yards apart.
The "box man" holds a pole that marks the line of scrimmage.

There may be additional chain crew members. A "clip man" is discussed below. In the NFL, additional chain crew members have additional tasks, such as to relieve the line judge of the clerical task of recording all assessed penalties. Despite the use of "man" in the colloquial terms for the chain crew positions, women can perform any of them.

Members of the chain crew are usually picked by the offices of the home team instead of the league or conference. In the NFL, members of the chain crew must have credentials entitling them to access to the field, and must wear white shirts. The home team pays them; some teams pay an hourly wage and others pay a flat rate to work a game.

The chain crew does not wear protective gear as players do. A routine instruction by officials to the chain crew is to withdraw or drop their signals, and move back, if the play comes toward them so as to endanger them. Often, the signals use bright orange color, are padded, and have break-away components for safety.

Location
For games at all levels except the NFL, the chain crew operates on the side of the field opposite the press box (usually the visiting team's sideline). 

In the NFL, the chain crew switches sides at halftime; the referee determines their initial placement. 

In the NCAA, the chains are located opposite the press box for the entire game. In the first half, the line judge is located opposite the press box and supervises the chain crew, with the head linesman on the press box side of the field. In the second half, the head linesman and line judge swap sides of the field like in the NFL, with the linesman supervising the chain crew. This practice started in 2014. 

In the NFL and other venues where there is a zone behind the sidelines, all three poles are placed somewhere along the back line of this zone.  Otherwise, the poles are placed along the sideline.

Auxiliary chain crew
For professional and college football games, an auxiliary chain crew operates on the opposite side of the field, supervised by the line judge. Their presence lets players and officials look to either side of the field for information. The auxiliary chain crew also includes the drive start indicator, which is placed at the beginning of a team's drive and stays there until the team loses possession. This indicator is only used for statistical purposes to calculate the distance of each drive. It looks similar to a "stick" and has an arrow (or occasionally a large "X") that points in the direction the offensive team is going.

The NFL previously used an additional fourth chain crew member, which held a rod marked with an X to mark the spot of the last drive start. The X marker was eliminated in 2018.

Operations
At the start of a series of downs, the linesman stands so that the heel of one foot marks the initial line of scrimmage. The box man places his indicator to mark this position and sets the box to display "1". The operator of the rear rod marks the same position, while the other rod man moves ten yards toward the defense's goal line to mark the line to gain.

The linesman, the box man, or a fourth member of the chain crew attaches a "clip" to the chain to line up with the rear edge of the closest five-yard line to the rear rod. A device on the clip indicates which numbered line this is. The clip and the device let the chain crew restore the position of the rods after a mishap. In leagues such as the NFL with Instant Replay, there may be multiple clips to let the rods be repositioned after a play is reviewed and reversed.

After a typical play, the box man increments the displayed number and realigns that pole to the new line of scrimmage, again as directed by the linesman. After a play that results in a first down, all three members move and reset their signals to mark a new series of downs.

The chain crew must not move until the referee or linesman signals whether the play finished without a penalty. On a penalty, the chain crew stays put so that the officials can see the original state. When the referee and linesman walk off the appropriate number of yards, the box man moves as well. The box man does not change the number displayed, except on a penalty that results in a loss of down. On a penalty that results in a first down, the entire chain crew moves and resets.

When possession of the ball switches to the other team, the forward rod becomes the rear rod and vice versa to minimize the distance the rod men have to move. However, at the end of the first and third quarters, when players switch directions on the field, the chain crew also moves (for example, a marker may move from one 32-yard line to the other 32-yard line). The rear rod man moves past the forward rod man and continues to mark the start of the series of downs, in the new orientation. The linesman and other officials supervise this movement, using one or more clips to exactly reposition the chains.

On plays where there is no line to gain (a series of downs that starts within 10 yards of the goal line, a try after touchdown, or a kickoff), the rod men lower or lay down their signals, but the box man continues to mark the line of scrimmage.

On-field measurements
 The chains are brought onto the field whenever the referee needs an accurate measurement to determine if a first down has been made. A team may also request an accurate measurement to determine how far they have to reach for the first down.

5-yard mark
Before the game, many linesmen attach a piece of tape at the midpoint of the chain. The linesman can compare the line of scrimmage to this mark at the start of a play and know whether a 5-yard penalty against the defense will result in a first down. If so, the linesman's typical hand signal to the line judge across the field is to extend the arms with the thumbs pointing toward one another. Such a gesture with thumbs pointing away signals that there are more than 5 yards to gain.

History
All levels of organized football use the chain crew. One notable exception at the professional level was the World Football League of 1974 to 1975, which used the "Dicker-rod," a proprietary, 90-inch stick that allowed measurements to be made with one person instead of three. The Dicker-rod was never used outside the WFL.

The "box" (down marker) has evolved over time. In the pre-television era, it was a rod (shorter than the height of the operator) with a triangular pointer that rotated to show the official the down number. It was replaced with a much larger, two-sided flipper system when television became widespread; flipper-style down markers are still in use in scholastic and amateur football. A more modern model is the Dial-a-Down, in which compact levers display a new down number over the entire face of the "box"; this model is used at most college and professional games. Electronic down markers using LEDs are emerging as the next advance. However, further application of technology to measure the lengthwise position of the football, such as sensors inside the football, may be resisted based on affection for the human element. Early attempts and proposals to use precision automatic chain instruments were hindered both by costs and potential hazards (early proposals required metal rails; a 1990s system used visible lasers). Lazser Down, a system that uses wideband radio waves to precisely spot and measure distances, has seen some rollout in college football, the Alliance of American Football and the XFL.

Notes

References

Further reading

American football terminology